is a train station in Miyazaki City, Miyazaki Prefecture, Japan. The station is distinct and at a different location from another station nearby of the same name which was opened in 1913 and closed in 1962.

Lines

Layout 
The station, which is unstaffed, consists of a side platform serving a single track at grade. There is no station building but a shed built near the station entrance serves as a waiting room. An automatic ticket vending machine has not been installed.

Adjacent stations

History
The line and its stations closed when the Miyazaki Railway ceased operations on 1 July 1962. Subsequently, Japanese National Railways (JNR) extended its then Shibushi Line north from  towards Minami-Miyazaki using largely the same route. The linkup, which included the reopening of some previously closed Miyazaki Railway stations, was completed on 8 May 1963, whereupon the route was renamed the Nichinan Line. Uchiumi was also opened on the same day. It used the name of a previously closed station nearby, but was a new station at a different location. With the privatization of JNR on 1 April 1987, the station came under the control of JR Kyushu.

Passenger statistics
In fiscal 2016, the station was used by an average of 19 passengers (boarding only) per day.

See also
List of railway stations in Japan

References

External links
Uchiumi (JR Kyushu)

Railway stations in Miyazaki Prefecture
Railway stations in Japan opened in 1963
Miyazaki (city)